Gordon Adams Daniel (5 April 1923 – 21 August 2009) was an English sound editor, with 51 different films from 1955 to 1988. He won the Academy Award for the film Grand Prix for Best Sound Editing at the 39th Academy Awards.

Selected filmography
Daniel's career spanned more than three decades.

Police Academy 5: Assignment Miami Beach (1988)
Wall Street (1987)
Platoon (1986)
European Vacation (1985)
Vision Quest (1985)
The Terminator (1984)
Taps (1981)
The Jerk (1979)
10 (1979)
The Longest Yard (1974)
Papillon (1973)
Grand Prix (1966)
The Spy Who Came in from the Cold (1965)
A Hard's Day Night (1964)
Village of the Damned (1960)

References

External links

1923 births
2009 deaths
British sound editors
Best Sound Editing Academy Award winners
People from Ormskirk